Wushu at the 2005 Southeast Asian Games took place in the Emilio Aguinaldo College Gymnasium, in Ermita, Manila, Philippines from November 28–30.

Medal table

Medalists

Men's taolu

Men's sanda

Women's taolu

Women's sanda

References

2005 Southeast Asian Games events
2005
2005 in wushu (sport)